David Abel Russell (1780 – November 24, 1861) was a U.S. Representative from New York.

He was born in Petersburg, New York and trained as a lawyer and practiced in Salem, New York. He was appointed Justice of the Peace in 1807. He was District Attorney of the Fourth District from 1813 to 1815. He was a member of the New York State Assembly in 1816, 1830 and 1833.

He was elected to Congress as an anti-Jacksonian and later became a Whig. He served three terms in Congress from March 4, 1835 to March 3, 1841.

He died in Salem and was buried in Evergreen Cemetery.

His sons were David Allen Russell, a Union general killed in action, and William A. Russell.

References

1780 births
1861 deaths
New York (state) lawyers
County district attorneys in New York (state)
People from Salem, New York
People from Petersburgh, New York
Members of the New York State Assembly
New York (state) National Republicans
National Republican Party members of the United States House of Representatives
Whig Party members of the United States House of Representatives from New York (state)
Burials in New York (state)
19th-century American politicians
19th-century American lawyers